Eldershaw is a surname. Notable people with the surname include: 

Flora Eldershaw (1897–1956), Australian novelist, critic and historian
M. Barnard Eldershaw, pseudonym used by Australian literary collaborators Marjorie Barnard and Flora Eldershaw
Simon Eldershaw (born 1983), English footballer